In gardening and agronomic terminology, a volunteer is a plant that grows on its own, rather than being deliberately planted by a farmer or gardener. Volunteers often grow from seeds that float in on the wind, are dropped by birds, or are inadvertently mixed into compost. Some volunteers may be encouraged by gardeners once they appear, being watered, fertilized, or otherwise cared for, unlike weeds, which are unwanted volunteers. The action of such plants — to sprout or grow in this fashion — may also be described as volunteering.

Volunteers that grow from the seeds of specific cultivars are not reliably identical or similar to their parent and often differ significantly from it. Such open pollinated plants, if they show desirable characteristics, may be selected to become new cultivars.

Law
This definition also has the meaning in the law context, defining the drug-producing plant like cannabis as a "volunteer" if it grows of its own accord from seeds or roots and is not intentionally planted. It may be special rules about how such plants are managed if any occurred after growing the cultivar legitimately under the license.

Agriculture
 

In agricultural rotations, self-set plants from the previous year's crop may become established as weeds in the current crop. For example, volunteer winter wheat will germinate to quite high levels in a following oilseed rape crop, usually requiring chemical control measures. In agricultural research, the high purity of a harvested crop is often desirable. To achieve this, typically a group of temporary workers will walk the crop rows looking for volunteer plants, or "rogue" plants in an exercise typically referred to as "roguing".

See also
Domestication
Escaped plant
Hemerochory
Invasive species
Noxious weed
Weed

References

Botany
Crops
Horticulture
Drug control law